The Santa Lucia Protected Landscape, also known as the Salcedo Protected Landscape, is a protected area located in the foothills of the Cordillera Central mountain range in the Ilocos Sur province of the Philippines. It protects an important watershed that serves as the water source for the surrounding communities in the municipality of Salcedo. It had an initial area of  proclaimed as the Santa Lucia Watershed Forest Reserve in 1938 through Proclamation No. 333 issued by President Manuel Luis Quezon. In 2000, the forest reserve was reestablished as a protected landscape area under the National Integrated Protected Areas System with the signing of Proclamation No. 296 by President Joseph Estrada.

Description
It was named after the nearby municipality of Santa Lucia when Balidbid was still under the jurisdiction of the municipality. The protected area is located on the north bank of the Buaya River. It is bordered on the north by the barangay of Calangcuasan, on the east by Madarang and Bago Creek, on the south by the Buaya River, and on the west by the lowlands of Salcedo's poblacion.

The Salcedo–Gregorio del Pilar Road runs along the park's southern portion. It is accessible via the Santa Lucia–Salcedo Road from the main highway (Manila North Road) in the west, and via the Candon–Galimuyod–Salcedo–del Pilar Road from the city of Candon in the northwest.

See also
 Libunao Protected Landscape
 Lidlidda Protected Landscape

References

Protected landscapes of the Philippines
Geography of Ilocos Sur
Protected areas established in 1938
1938 establishments in the Philippines